Quality Protein Maize (QPM) is a family of maize varieties. QPM grain contains nearly twice as much lysine and tryptophan, amino acids that are essential for humans and monogastric animals but are limiting amino acids in grains. QPM is a product of conventional plant breeding (i.e., it is not genetically modified) and an example of biofortification.

QPM was developed by Surinder Vasal and Evangelina Villegas at the International Maize and Wheat Improvement Center (CIMMYT) in the late 1990s. For their achievement, they won the 2000 World Food Prize.

Need for quality protein maize

In Central and South America, Africa, and Asia, several hundred million people rely on maize as their principal daily food, for weaning babies, and for feeding livestock. Unfortunately maize (corn) has two significant flaws; it lacks the full range of amino acids, namely lysine and tryptophan, needed to produce proteins, and has its niacin (vitamin B3) bound in an indigestible complex. The Mayans and Aztecs used to boil maize in alkaline limewater, nixtamalization, which broke down the complex so that the Niacin became available. However, in the main this practice did not transfer to the Old World or settlers in the "New World" which resulted in epidemics of Pellagra from the 16th century onwards. In addition diets high in corn produce a condition known as wet-malnutrition a person is receiving sufficient calories, but her or his body malfunctions due to a lack of protein. A chronic lack of protein in the diet leads to kwashiorkor.

Thus, conventional maize is a poor-quality food staple; unless consumed as part of a varied diet which is beyond the means of most people in the developing world.

QPM produces 70–100% more of lysine and tryptophan than the most modern varieties of tropical maize. These two amino acids allow the body to manufacture complete proteins, thereby eliminating wet-malnutrition. In addition tryptophan can be converted in the body to Niacin, which theoretically reduces the incidence of Pellagra.

Development
Modified maize with higher protein content dated back to the 1920s, and the "opaque-2" variety had been developed in 1963.  While its lysine and tryptophan levels were better than those of conventional maize, opaque-2 had lower yields and a soft, chalky kernel, which made it more susceptible to ear rot and insect damage. Moreover, the taste and kernel appearance dissatisfied consumers, who ultimately rejected the enhanced-protein varieties in the market.

Vasal-Villegas team
Surinder Vasal and Evangelina Villegas began their collaborative research in Mexico in the early 1970s while they were working at CIMMYT. Dr. Villegas was in charge of the lab investigating protein quality and Dr. Vasal was a plant breeder newly assigned to work on developing QPM varieties that would gain widespread acceptance.

Integrating cereal chemistry and plant breeding techniques, Drs. Vasal and Villegas collaborated to combine the existing opaque-2 maize with genetic modifiers. Through the 1970s, they produced and analyzed germplasms at an astonishing rate, sometimes processing up to 25,000 samples a year. By the mid-1980s, they had produced a QPM germplasm with hard kernel characteristics and good taste similar to the traditional grain and with much higher quality levels of lysine and tryptophan.

However, their discovery remained unexploited for years because many nutritionists felt that protein could be added to the diets of the most poor in other ways. In the early 1990s, CIMMYT gained the international support and funding to begin promoting QPM in Ghana and several other African countries. Since then, QPM has also yielded very positive results in China, Mexico, and parts of Central America.

Genetics 
The opaque-2 mutation reduces the transcription of lysine-lacking zein-related seed storage proteins and, as a result, increased the abundance of other proteins that are rich in lysine. The lack of zein causes a soft texture, necessitating further development for "hard endosperm o.2" that lead to QPM.

Impact
Babies and adults consuming QPM are healthier and at lower risk for malnutrition disorders such as marasmus and kwashiorkor, and data from Latin America and Africa show the grain’s role in reversing the effects of malnutrition in those already affected. QPM offers 90% the nutritional value of skim milk, the standard for adequate nutrition value. At a time when UNICEF reports that 1,000,000 infants and small children are starving each month, the inclusion of QPM in daily rations improves health and saves lives. Additionally, pigs fed QPM experience rapid weight gain and are ready for market sooner or can provide an additional quality protein source for small farm families.

QPM hybrids have been developed and tested for varying climatic and growing conditions; QPM varieties are grown on roughly 9 million acres (36,000 km²) worldwide. Meanwhile, QPM research and development have spread from Mexico to throughout Latin America and to Africa, Europe, and Asia. In Guizhou, the poorest province in China, QPM hybrid yields are 10% higher than those of other hybrids, and the crop has enabled new pig production enterprises, bringing increased food security and disposable income. In total, the QPM germplasm has grown to contribute over US$1 billion annually to the economies of developing countries.
In India Centre of Excellence on Processing & Value Addition of Maize has been established at Udaipur city of Rajasthan under the Rashtriya Krishi Vikas Yojna to ensure better utilization of quality Protein maize in commercial food products and Industry. This centre has developed several bakery products like Biscuit, cake muffins, extruded products puffcorns and pasta using QPM flour.

References

Tropical agriculture
Maize varieties